Morita may refer to:

In places:
 Morita, Aomori, a village in Japan
 Morita, Togo, a town in Togo

People with the surname Morita:
see list of people at Morita (surname)

Other:
 A type of chipotle
 A fictional assault rifle from the film Starship Troopers
 Morita Shogi 64, a Nintendo 64 game

See also 
 Morita conjectures
 Morita equivalence
 Morita therapy